The French Colonial Conference was an event held in Paris, France, in 1935.

References
 Ahanda, Marie-Thérèse Assiga (2003): "Charles Atangana". Bonaberi.com. Accessed 30 October 2006.
 Maunier, René, transl. by Lorimer, E. A. (1998). The Sociology of Colonies: An Introduction to the Study of Race Contact, Part One. London: Routledge.

French colonial empire
French Third Republic
Former French colonies
1935 in France
20th-century diplomatic conferences
Diplomatic conferences in France
1935 in international relations
1935 conferences